Point Escuminac is a cape located in eastern New Brunswick,  Canada.  Its geographic coordinates are 47º04'N, 64º48'W.

It is the dividing point for delineating the western limits of the Northumberland Strait.  It is located near the unincorporated fishing community of Escuminac, at the mouth of Miramichi Bay.

See also
List of lighthouses in New Brunswick

References

External links
 Point Escuminac, NB Lighthouse Friends
 Aids to Navigation Canadian Coast Guard

Escuminac
Landforms of Northumberland County, New Brunswick
Lighthouses in New Brunswick